Ronald Gorell Barnes, 3rd Baron Gorell,  (16 April 1884 – 2 May 1963) was a British peer, Liberal politician, poet, author and newspaper editor.

Early life and education
Gorell was the second son of John Gorell Barnes, 1st Baron Gorell, President of the Probate Divorce and Admiralty Division of the High Court of Justice.

Gorell was educated at Winchester College, Harrow School and Balliol College, Oxford. While at Oxford, he played first-class cricket for the University cricket team. After leaving Oxford, Gorell played with Marylebone Cricket Club (MCC) for 13 seasons, 431 runs and 43 wickets in his 19-match career. In 1909 he was admitted to Inner Temple, to practice as a barrister, and worked as a journalist for The Times from 1911 to 1915.

Military and career

During World War I he served in the Rifle Brigade, where he reached the rank of captain, was mentioned in despatches and, in 1917, received the Military Cross. 

Barnes succeeded as third Baron Gorell on 16 January 1917 after his unmarried elder brother was killed in the War. After the war, he took his seat on the Liberal benches in the House of Lords and in July 1921 he was appointed Under-Secretary of State for Air in the coalition government of David Lloyd George, an office he held until the government fell in October 1922. He was the founder of the (Royal) Army Education Corps in which he enabled the army "to take an immense step forward; the biggest it has ever taken" (Field Marshal Sir Henry Wilson, Chief of the Imperial General Staff). Barnes' autobiography is One Man... Many Parts.

After the war, he spent two years working at the War Office as Deputy Director of Staff Duties (Education),
and then served a year as Under-Secretary of State for Air from 1921 to 1922. In 1925, he left the Liberals and joined the Labour Party.

He then devoted his life to literature, editing the Cornhill Magazine, while still serving on many public and private committees.

Charitable work
Gorell was involved with many charities, particularly those that were educational or literary in nature. He was chairman of the Teachers' Registration Council (1922–1935), King's College Hospital (1929–1933), and of Dulwich College and Alleyn's School (1949–1959), and president of the National Council for the Unmarried Mother and her Child (1928–1962), the Royal Society of Teachers (1929–1935), and of the Royal Literary Fund (1951–1962).

Personal life and honours

Gorell was invested as an Officer of the Order of the British Empire in the 1918 Birthday Honours and as a Commander of the same order in 1919. He was also invested as an Officier of the Order of Leopold in 1919.

He was later editor of the Cornhill Magazine from 1933 to 1939. He was co-president of the Detection Club with Agatha Christie from 1956 to 1963.

Lord Gorell married Maud Elizabeth Furse Radcliffe (1886–1954), eldest daughter of Alexander Nelson Radcliffe and Isabel Grace Henderson, in 1922. He died at his home in Arundel, aged 79, and was succeeded in the barony by his eldest son Timothy John Radcliffe Barnes.

Bibliography

Gorell wrote 14 works of fiction, mainly detective stories, and several collections of poetry, published by John Murray.

In the Night (1917)
DEQ (1922)
Venturers All (1927)
The Devouring Fire (1928)
He Who Fights (1928)
Devil's Drum (1929)
Red Lilac (1935)
Wild Thyme and other stories (1941)
Murder at Mavering (1943)
Luck and other new stories (1948)
Let Not Thy Left Hand (1949)
Earl's End (1951)
Where There's a Head (1952)
Murder at Manor House (1954)

See also
Baron Gorell

References

Sources

Kidd, Charles, Williamson, David (editors). Debrett's Peerage and Baronetage (1990 edition). New York: St Martin's Press, 1990.

External links
CricketArchive profile

Gorell, Ronald Gorell Barnes, 3rd Baron
Gorell, Ronald Gorell Barnes, 3rd Baron
Gorell, Ronald Gorell Barnes, 3rd Baron
Gorell, Ronald Gorell Barnes, 3rd Baron
Gorell, Ronald Gorell Barnes, 3rd Baron
Rifle Brigade officers
Military personnel from London
Recipients of the Military Cross
British Army personnel of World War I
Marylebone Cricket Club cricketers
Oxford University cricketers
English cricketers
People educated at Winchester College
People educated at Harrow School
Alumni of Balliol College, Oxford
Suffolk cricketers
British male novelists
20th-century British novelists
British mystery writers
Commanders of the Order of the British Empire
Younger sons of barons
20th-century British male writers
Members of the Detection Club
British sportsperson-politicians